Karina Inge Sørensen (born 22 February 1980) is a retired Danish badminton player from Hvidovre BC. She graduated with a masters degree in international marketing from the University of Southern Denmark in 2008. She is also involved in judo as development consultant in Danish Judo & Ju-Jitsu Federation.

Achievements

European Junior Championships 
Girls' doubles

Mixed doubles

BWF International Challenge/Series 
Women's doubles

Mixed doubles

  BWF International Challenge tournament
  BWF/IBF International Series tournament
  BWF Future Series tournament

References

External links 

1980 births
Living people
People from Hvidovre Municipality
Danish female badminton players
Sportspeople from the Capital Region of Denmark